The Red Lanterns were the women's fighting groups organized by village women who were not allowed to join the men's groups during the Boxer Uprising of 1900. Villagers said these women had supernatural powers and were called upon to perform tasks which the male Boxers could not.

Background
Unlike the Taiping rebels but like many Chinese folk sects such as the White Lotus Sect, Boxer ideology forbade contact with women. Boxer discipline in its strictest form did not allow sexual contact with or even looking at a woman for fear that the female's polluting yin would destroy the invulnerability ritual.

Nevertheless, women organized parallel units: The Red Lanterns (Hongdeng zhao, i.e. "Red Lanterns Shining"), for younger women, "Blue Lanterns" (Landeng zhao) for middle-aged women, and Black Lanterns (Heideng zhao) for elderly women. The Red Lanterns ranged in age from twelve to eighteen, did not set their hair in the traditional way and did not bind their feet. They wore red coats and trousers, red hats, and red shoes, and each carried a red lantern. They were convinced that they could leap up to heaven when they waved their red fans. They were trained for up to five months in order to cultivate their powers.

A folk song had it:

 Wearing all red,
 Carrying a small red lantern,
 Woosh, with a wave of the fan
 Up they fly to heaven.

Activities in 1900

Reliable accounts of Red Lantern activities are hard to find. They are mentioned in second or third hand accounts as being able to walk on water, fly, set fire to Christians' homes, and stop their guns, powers which the male Boxers themselves did not claim. But the only good accounts of their actual activities come from the Battle of Tientsin, when they nursed wounded Boxers and did work such as sewing and cleaning.

These young women also had the power to protect the Boxers who were fighting the invaders.  One former Boxer recalled in an oral history in the 1950s that “a brother-disciple,” that is, a fellow Boxer, “would hold a piece of rope in his hand.... and direct the fighting. The Boxers would fight down below, while the Red Lanterns would watch from above, appearing suspended in the sky, no larger than a chicken’s egg.” These Red Lanterns could throw swords through the air and lop off the heads of the invaders, as well as removing the screws from their cannons. When the Red Lanterns stood still, they could send their souls into battle.

The Red Lanterns were also famous for their healing powers. In the 1950s, a former Red Lantern told another oral history project of the senior “sister disciple” who could go into a trance, clap her hands in the direction of a sick person, and cure the illness. Another Red Lantern, the Holy Mother of the Yellow Lotus, had the reputation of being able to heal wounds by sprinkling clear water on them and even bringing the dead back to life by rubbing their bodies.

When Boxer magic failed, women frequently took the blame. For instance, when Beijing's Church of the Saviour withstood weeks of attack by explosives and fire, the Boxers blamed this failure on the Catholic women inside, who were said to expose themselves and wave "dirty things," causing the spirits of the Boxers to leave their bodies. The answer was to await the arrival of the Red Lanterns: "The Red Lanterns are all girls and young women, so they do not fear dirty things."

In the years following the defeat of the Boxers, villagers traded stories concerning their exploits. One told of Red Lantern women appearing at buildings in Tianjin which the Qing armies could not capture from the foreigners. They caught the bullets from the foreign guns in their flower baskets and scattered them to set the buildings afire, forcing the French and Japanese soldiers to flee. Other village stories spread an egalitarian message of sharing wealth equally and opposing the monarchy. One was that after they attacked the Foreign Legations, the Red Lanterns spread the slogan of killing "a dragon, a tiger, and three hundred rams." The dragon was the emperor, the tiger was Prince Qing, and the three hundred rams were the officials of the central government.

Another such legend concerned Azure Cloud, a young village woman who was said to be able to jump ten feet in the air as an expert in martial arts. She developed a deep hatred of foreigners. The legend had it that when the International Expedition entered Beijing, she killed many of the invaders. When Boxer leaders turned into collaborators and committed unspeakable crimes, Azure Cloud invited these traitors for a banquet. She denounced them: "I would never have believed you could be such beasts. It is your fault that the country is on the verge of collapse." She then executed them and disappeared without a trace. A village song bragged:

 The red lantern shines,
 Lighting the path for the people.

In legend and history

Academic histories in China mentioned the Red Lanterns only in passing, even after 1949, when the Boxer movement was considered a patriotic uprising of the masses. But suddenly in 1967, the Red Lanterns became hot topics in the Chinese national media. The Cultural Revolution was at its most radical phase, and the radical student youth groups, the Red Guards, reached the heights of their fervor. Like them, the Red Lanterns were red, young and rebellious, and one Red Guard group chose the name “Red Lantern Fighting Force.”

The  Model Revolutionary Opera, The Legend of the Red Lantern, produced by Mao Zedong’s wife, Jiang Qing, had no connection to the Boxer movement, but popularized the Red Lantern into a revolutionary symbol. A campaign in official Party newspapers saw a direct connection with the Red Lanterns of 1900. Official editorials attacked Liu Shaoqi, Mao’s former second in command, for detesting the Boxers, and called upon the Red Guards to carry on the spirit of the Red Lanterns.

The Red Lanterns appear as antagonists in the Hong Kong martial arts film Once Upon a Time in China IV (1993).

See also

 Secret society

References

Chinese people of the Boxer Rebellion
Chinese secret societies
Women in 19th-century warfare
Women in 20th-century warfare 
Women in China
Chinese folklore
Women in war in China
1890s establishments in China